Sabzevar (also Romanized as Sabzevār; also known as Godār-e Gūr Sefīd and Gūr Sefīd-e Sabzevār) is a village in Veysian Rural District, Veysian District, Dowreh County, Lorestan Province, Iran. At the 2006 census, its population was 820, in 203 families.

References 

Towns and villages in Dowreh County